Scirocco (F 573) is the fourth ship of the Maestrale-class frigate of the Italian Navy.

Development  
The Maestrale-class frigates were primarily designed for anti-submarine warfare (ASW), however the ships are highly flexible so they are also capable of anti-air and anti-surface operations. Ships of this class have been widely used in various international missions, either under NATO or UN flag, and during normal operations of the Italian Navy.

The first of these ships entered in service in early 1982. The rest of the fleet was launched over the next three years. The ships of the Maestrale class will be replaced by the Bergamini class.

Construction and career 
She was laid down on 26 February 1980 and launched on 17 April 1982 by Fincantieri shipyards. Commissioned on 20 September 1983 with the hull number F 573. She was decommissioned on 20 February 2020.

Gallery

References

External links
 Ships Marina Militare website

Maestrale-class frigates
1982 ships
Ships built by Fincantieri
Frigates of the Cold War